The Coral Island is a children's television series, adapted from the 19th-century novel The Coral Island by Scottish author R. M. Ballantyne. The series of 9 episodes was a joint production of the Australian Broadcasting Corporation and Thames Television. It was filmed on location in the western Samoan village of Salamumu and then on the Whitsunday Islands off the Queensland coast in 1981.

The series was first broadcast in Australia on ABC-TV on 6 January 1983.

Plot 

The story, set in 1840, centers on 3 boys from Ireland and their ease of survival when they in a big city. Bob (played by Scott McGregor), Peterkin (played by Nicholas Bond-Owen) and Reginald (played by Richard Gibson) must learn to survive with their parents , despite their very different characters and backgrounds. After befriending two old women in the city, they are rescued by a kidnappers to join a secret organization.

Cast 

 Nicholas Bond-Owen — as the boy Peterkin
 Richard Gibson — as the boy Ralph
 Scott McGregor — as the boy Jack
 Gerard Kennedy — as the pirate Bloody Bill
 Brian McDermott — as the pirate Captain Carver
 Pele Teuila — as the female native Avatea
 Uelese Petaia — as the native Tararo
 Peter Collingwood — as Reverend McNab
 Charles 'Bud' Tingwell — as the captain Sir Charles Rover
 Lyn James — as Lady Rover

References

External links 

 The Coral Island at IMDb

Australian Broadcasting Corporation original programming
1983 Australian television series debuts
Australian children's television series
Australian drama television series
ITV children's television shows
Television shows produced by Thames Television
English-language television shows